Peter Richens was a British screenwriter. Richens is perhaps best known as the writing partner of Peter Richardson, writer/director/star of the long-running TV series The Comic Strip Presents.

Biography
In Richens's own words, Richardson was "the boss" of the script, with Richens acting as a "mechanic" who was "paid to make these ideas work." His talent for shaping a script was honed in the early days of The Comic Strip stage performances, where he would transcribe the best of the performer's improvisations and create a coherent narrative from them.  He also acted as associate director on Comic Strip productions, and enjoyed the occasional cameo role, notably as a cheerful depressive in Gregory: Diary of a Nutcase.

Death
Richens died at the age of 65. No cause of death was immediately announced.

Filmography

Film
Eat the Rich (1987) as Cafe Owner

TV series
The Comic Strip Presents... (6 episodes) (1988–1993)

Writer
The Comic Strip Presents... (24 episodes) (1982–2016)
The Supergrass (1985)
Eat the Rich (1987)
The Pope Must Die (1991)
Jenny Eclair Squats (1997)
Private Function (1999)
Churchill: The Hollywood Years (2004)

References

External links

The Comic Strip
1952 births
2018 deaths
British screenwriters
English male screenwriters
Writers from Devon